Wynnburg is an unincorporated community and census-designated place (CDP) in Lake County, Tennessee, United States. Its ZIP code is 38077.

Demographics

Notes

Census-designated places in Lake County, Tennessee
Unincorporated communities in Lake County, Tennessee
Unincorporated communities in Tennessee